Bolshiye Luzhki is a rural locality (a village) in Kupriyanovskoye Rural Settlement, Gorokhovetsky District, Vladimir Oblast, Russia. The population was 29 as of 2010.

Geography 
Bolshiye Luzhki is located on the Klyazma River, 16 km southwest of Gorokhovets (the district's administrative centre) by road. Malye Luzhki is the nearest rural locality.

References 

Rural localities in Gorokhovetsky District